Simmons Glacier is a glacier draining northward between Mount Isherwood and Mount Strange in the east part of the Kohler Range, Marie Byrd Land. Mapped by United States Geological Survey (USGS) from surveys and U.S. Navy air photos, 1959–66. Named by Advisory Committee on Antarctic Names (US-ACAN) for Harry S. Simmons, assistant to the United States Antarctic Research Program (USARP) Representative in Christchurch, New Zealand, for four seasons, 1969-70 through 1972–73. His duties took him to Antarctica in 1971 and 1973.

References

Glaciers of Marie Byrd Land